A Change Is Gonna Come is the debut album by American soul singer–songwriter Leela James. It was released on Warner Bros. Records on June 21, 2005 in the United States.

Overview
James covers Sam Cooke's "A Change Is Gonna Come" and No Doubt's "Don't Speak" on the album.

Critical reception

Allmusic editor Andy Kellman wrote that the album "retains a nostalgic tint. James has the stature of a woman who should possess a squeaky voice, but she sings with demonstrative grit. More importantly, she doesn't see her inspirations merely as artists to mimic; she sees how they learned from the past and applied it to the present. The past is built upon (if only a little), rather than simply revisited [...] There's plenty of thematic range, whether there are blue lights in the basement, tears on the pillow, sweat on the dancefloor, or sun showers on the porch."

Track listing
Credits adapted from the liner notes of A Change Is Gonna Come.

Notes
  denotes co-producer

Sample credits
"Good Time" contains replayed elements from "Funky Sensation", written by Kenton Nix, performed by Gwen McCrae.
"When You Love Somebody" contains elements of "I Love You More Than You'll Ever Know", written by Al Kooper. 
"Didn't I" embodies portions of "I Can't Fake It Anymore", written by D. Monda and T. Taylor. 
"Long Time Coming" embodies portions of "The Truth", written by Dwight Grant, Kanye West and Graham Nash.

Charts

References

External links
 

2005 debut albums
Leela James albums
Albums produced by Kanye West
Albums produced by Raphael Saadiq
Albums produced by Wyclef Jean
Warner Records albums